The aardwolf (Proteles cristata) is an insectivorous species of hyena, native to East and Southern Africa. Its name means "earth-wolf" in Afrikaans and Dutch. It is also called the maanhaar-jackal (Afrikaans for "mane-jackal"), termite-eating hyena and civet hyena, based on its habit of secreting substances from its anal gland, a characteristic shared with the African civet.

Unlike many of its relatives in the order Carnivora, the aardwolf does not hunt large animals. It eats insects and their larvae, mainly termites; one aardwolf can lap up as many as 300,000 termites during a single night using its long, sticky tongue. The aardwolf's tongue has adapted to be tough enough to withstand the strong bite of termites.

The aardwolf lives in the shrublands of eastern and southern Africa – open lands covered with stunted trees and shrubs. It is nocturnal, resting in burrows during the day and emerging at night to seek food.

Taxonomy
The aardwolf is generally classified with the hyena family Hyaenidae, though it was formerly placed in its own family Protelidae. Early on, scientists felt that it was merely mimicking the striped hyena, which subsequently led to the creation of Protelidae. Recent studies have suggested that the aardwolf probably diverged from other hyaenids early on; how early is still unclear, as the fossil record and genetic studies disagree by 10 million years.

The aardwolf is the only surviving species in the subfamily Protelinae. There is disagreement as to whether the species is monotypic, or can be divided into subspecies P. c. cristatus of Southern Africa and P. c. septentrionalis of East Africa.

A 2006 molecular analysis indicates that it is phylogenetically the most basal of the four extant hyaenidae species.

Etymology
The generic name proteles comes from two words both of Greek origin, protos and teleos which combined means "complete in front" based on the fact that they have five toes on their front feet and four on the rear. The specific name, cristatus, comes from Latin and means "provided with a comb", relating to their mane.

Description

The aardwolf resembles a very thin striped hyena, but with a more slender muzzle, black vertical stripes on a coat of yellowish fur, and a long, distinct mane down the midline of the neck and back. It also has one or two diagonal stripes down the fore- and hind-quarters, along with several stripes on its legs. The mane is raised during confrontations to make the aardwolf appear larger. It is missing the throat spot that others in the family have. Its lower leg (from the knee down) is all black, and its tail is bushy with a black tip.

The aardwolves in the south of the continent tend to be smaller (about ) than the eastern version (around ). This makes the aardwolf, the smallest extant member of the Hyaenidae family. The front feet have five toes each, unlike the four-toed hyena. The teeth and skull are similar in shape to those of other hyenas, though much smaller, and its cheek teeth are specialised for eating insects. It does still have canines, but, unlike other hyenas, these teeth are used primarily for fighting and defense. Its ears, which are large, are very similar to those of the striped hyena.

As an aardwolf ages, it will normally lose some of its teeth, though this has little impact on its feeding habits due to the softness of the insects that it eats.

Distribution and habitat
Aardwolves live in open, dry plains and bushland, avoiding mountainous areas. Due to their specific food requirements, they are only found in regions where termites of the family Hodotermitidae occur. Termites of this family depend on dead and withered grass and are most populous in heavily grazed grasslands and savannahs, including farmland. For most of the year, aardwolves spend time in shared territories consisting of up to a dozen dens, which are occupied for six weeks at a time.

There are two distinct populations: one in Southern Africa, and another in East and Northeast Africa. The species does not occur in the intermediary miombo forests.

Behavior and ecology

Aardwolves are shy and nocturnal, sleeping in burrows by day. They will, on occasion during the winter, become diurnal feeders. This happens during the coldest periods as they then stay in at night to conserve heat.

They have often been mistaken for solitary animals. In fact, they live as monogamous pairs with their young. If the intruder is caught, which rarely happens, a fight will occur, which is accompanied by soft clucking, hoarse barking, and a type of roar. The majority of incursions occur during mating season, when they can occur once or twice per week. When food is scarce, the stringent territorial system may be abandoned and as many as three pairs may occupy a single territory.

The territory is marked by both sexes, as they both have developed anal glands from which they extrude a black substance that is smeared on rocks or grass stalks in -long streaks. Aardwolves also have scent glands on the forefoot and penile pad. They often mark near termite mounds within their territory every 20 minutes or so. If they are patrolling their territorial boundaries, the marking frequency increases drastically, to once every . At this rate, an individual may mark 60 marks per hour, and upwards of 200 per night.

An aardwolf pair may have up to 10 dens, and numerous feces middens, within their territory. When they deposit excreta at their middens, they dig a small hole and cover it with sand. Their dens are usually abandoned aardvark, springhare, or porcupine dens, or on occasion they are crevices in rocks. They will also dig their own dens, or enlarge dens started by springhares. They typically will only use one or two dens at a time, rotating through all of their dens every six months. During the summer, they may rest outside their den during the night and sleep underground during the heat of the day.

Aardwolves are not fast runners nor are they particularly adept at fighting off predators. Therefore, when threatened, the aardwolf may attempt to mislead its foe by doubling back on its tracks. If confronted, it may raise its mane in an attempt to appear more menacing. It also emits a foul-smelling liquid from its anal glands.

Feeding
The aardwolf feeds primarily on termites and more specifically on Trinervitermes. This genus of termites has different species throughout the aardwolf's range. In East Africa, they eat Trinervitermes bettonianus, in central Africa, they eat Trinervitermes rhodesiensis, and in southern Africa, they eat T. trinervoides. Their technique consists of licking them off the ground as opposed to the aardvark, which digs into the mound. They locate their food by sound and also from the scent secreted by the soldier termites. An aardwolf may consume up to 250,000 termites per night using its long, sticky tongue.

They do not destroy the termite mound or consume the entire colony, thus ensuring that the termites can rebuild and provide a continuous supply of food. They often memorize the location of such nests and return to them every few months. During certain seasonal events, such as the onset of the rainy season and the cold of midwinter, the primary termites become scarce, so the need for other foods becomes pronounced. During these times, the southern aardwolf will seek out Hodotermes mossambicus, a type of harvester termite active in the afternoon, which explains some of their diurnal behavior in the winter. The eastern aardwolf, during the rainy season, subsists on termites from the genera Odontotermes and Macrotermes. They are also known to feed on other insects, larvae, eggs, and, some sources say, occasionally small mammals and birds, but these constitute a very small percentage of their total diet.

Unlike other hyenas, aardwolves do not scavenge or kill larger animals. Contrary to popular myths, aardwolves do not eat carrion, and if they are seen eating while hunched over a dead carcass, they are actually eating larvae and beetles. Also, contrary to some sources, they do not like meat, unless it is finely ground or cooked for them. The adult aardwolf was formerly assumed to forage in small groups, but more recent research has shown that they are primarily solitary foragers, necessary because of the scarcity of their insect prey.

Breeding
The breeding season varies depending on location, but normally takes place during autumn or spring. In South Africa, breeding occurs in early July. During the breeding season, unpaired male aardwolves search their own territory, as well as others, for a female to mate with. Dominant males also mate opportunistically with the females of less dominant neighboring aardwolves, which can result in conflict between rival males. Dominant males even go a step further and as the breeding season approaches, they make increasingly greater and greater incursions onto weaker males' territories. As the female comes into oestrus, they add pasting to their tricks inside of the other territories, sometimes doing so more in rivals' territories than their own. Females will also, when given the opportunity, mate with the dominant male, which increases the chances of the dominant male guarding "his" cubs with her. Copulation lasts between 1 and 4.5 hours.

Gestation lasts between 89 and 92 days, producing two to five cubs (most often two or three) during the rainy season (November–December), when termites are more active. The first six to eight weeks are spent in the den with their parents. The male may spend up to six hours a night watching over the cubs while the mother is out looking for food. After three months, they begin supervised foraging, and by four months are normally independent, though they often share a den with their mother until the next breeding season. By the time the next set of cubs is born, the older cubs have moved on. Aardwolves generally achieve sexual maturity at one and a half to two years of age.

Conservation
The aardwolf has not seen decreasing numbers and is relatively widespread throughout eastern Africa. They are not common throughout their range, as they maintain a density of no more than 1 per square kilometer, if food is abundant. Because of these factors, the IUCN has rated the aardwolf as least concern. In some areas, they are persecuted because of the mistaken belief that they prey on livestock; however, they are actually beneficial to the farmers because they eat termites that are detrimental. In other areas, the farmers have recognized this, but they are still killed, on occasion, for their fur. Dogs and insecticides are also common killers of the aardwolf.

In captivity

Frankfurt Zoo in Germany was home to the oldest recorded aardwolf in captivity at 18 years and 11 months.

Notes

References

References

Further reading

External links

 Animal Diversity Web
 IUCN Hyaenidae Specialist Group Aardwolf pages on hyaenidae.org
 Cam footage from the Namib desert https://m.youtube.com/watch?v=lRevqS6Pxgg 
 

Mammals described in 1783
Carnivorans of Africa
Hyenas
Mammals of Southern Africa
Fauna of East Africa
Myrmecophagous mammals
Taxa named by Anders Sparrman